Jussila is a Finnish surname. Notable people with the surname include:

 Asko Jussila (born 1963), Finnish football manager
 Eetu Jussila (1882–1973), Finnish farmer and politician
 Esko Jussila (born 1934), Finnish skier
 Kustaa Jussila (1879–1964), Finnish farmer and politician
 Mauno Jussila (1908–1988), Finnish politician
 Osmo Jussila (1938-2019), Finnish historian
 Roope Jussila (1943–2013), Finnish diplomat

Finnish-language surnames
Surnames of Finnish origin